The Archdeacon of Cashel, Waterford and Lismore is a senior ecclesiastical officer within the Anglican Diocese of Cashel and Ossory. The current incumbent is Bob Gray.
As such he is responsible for the disciplinary supervision of the clergy  within the parts of the diocese covered formerly by the Archdeacons of Cashel, Waterford and Lismore.

References

 
 
 
 
Lists of Anglican archdeacons in Ireland
Diocese of Cashel and Ossory